This is a list of named geological features on Mimas, a moon that orbits the planet Saturn.  Mimantean features are named after people and places in Arthurian legend or the legends of the Titans. The sole exception to this is Herschel Crater, named after William Herschel, the astronomer who discovered Mimas in 1789. That name was chosen before the International Astronomical Union set a guideline for naming geological features on Mimas.

Chasms

Mimas' chasmata are named after locations in Arthurian legend and the legends of the Titans.

Craters

With the exception of Herschel, the craters of Mimas are named after characters in Arthurian legend.

Crater chains

Mimas's sole named catena is named after a location in Arthurian legend.

External links

 USGS: Mimas nomenclature

Mimas (moon)
Mimas (moon)
Mimas